Dopamine fasting is a form of digital detox, involving temporarily abstaining from addictive technologies such as social media, listening to music on technological platforms, and Internet gaming, and can be extended to temporary deprivation of social interaction and eating. The term's origins are unknown; it was first widely promoted by the life coach “Improvement Pill” in November 2018 on YouTube. 

The practice has been referred to as a "maladaptive fad" by one Harvard researcher. Other critics say that it is based on a misunderstanding of how the neurotransmitter dopamine, which operates within the brain to reward behavior, actually works and can be altered by conscious behavior. 

The idea behind it is to take a break from the repetitive patterns of excitement and stimulation that can be triggered by interaction with digital technology, and that the practice of avoiding pleasurable activities can work to undo bad habits, allow time for self-reflection, and bolster personal happiness.

Definitions 
The practice of dopamine fasting is not clearly defined in what it entails, on what technologies, with what frequency it should be done, or how it is supposed to work. Some proponents limit the process to avoiding online technology; others extend it to abstaining from all work, exercise, physical contact and unnecessary conversation.

According to Cameron Sepah, a proponent of the practice, the purpose is not to literally reduce dopamine in the body but rather to reduce impulsive behaviors that are rewarded by it. One account suggests that the practice is about avoiding cues, such as hearing the ring of a smartphone, that can trigger impulsive behaviors, such as remaining on the smartphone after the call to play a game. In one sense, dopamine fasting is a reaction to technology firms which have engineered their services to keep people hooked. 

Dopamine fasting has been said to resemble the fasting tradition of many religions. An extreme form of dopamine fasting would be complete sensory deprivation, where all external stimuli are removed in order to promote a sense of calm and wellbeing.

Effects 

Proponents of dopamine fasting argue that it is a way to exert greater self-control and self-discipline over one's life, and New York Times technology journalist Nellie Bowles found that dopamine fasting made her subject's everyday life "more exciting and fun".

It has been described as a fad and a craze associated with Silicon Valley. An account in Vice, saying "If the idea of abstaining from anything fun in order to increase your mental clarity is appealing, congratulations: You and the notorious biohackers in Silicon Valley are on the same wave."

Scientific basis 

Detractors say that the overall concept of dopamine fasting is unscientific since the chemical plays a vital role in everyday life; literally reducing it would not be good for a person, and removing a particular stimulus like social media would not reduce the levels of dopamine in the body, only the stimulation of it.  Ciara McCabe, Associate Professor in Neuroscience at the University of Reading, considers the idea that the brain could be "reset" by avoiding dopamine triggers for a short time to be "nonsense".

Cameron Sepah, who has promoted the practice of dopamine fasting, agrees that the name is misleading and says that its purpose is not to literally reduce dopamine in the body but rather to reduce the impulsive behaviors that are rewarded by it.

Besides the impulsive behavior control – regulated by the prefrontal cortex, it’s never been conclusively proven that technology use hardens the brain to dopamine’s effects. Technology use induces a dopamine response on par with any normal, enjoyable experience — roughly a 50% to 100% increase. By contrast, cocaine and methamphetamine — two highly addictive drugs — cause a dopamine spike of 350% and 1200% respectively. In addition, dopamine receptors themselves — the cells in the brain activated in different ways by dopamine’s release — respond differently to tech use than they do to substance abuse, with no evidence that they become less sensitive to dopamine with frequent tech use, in the way they do with substance abuse. In the final analysis, it is erroneous to assume that avoiding "dopamine spikes" may upregulate dopamine receptors, causing an "increase in motivation or pleasure". Conversely, freeing oneself from bad habits may free up time for healthier habits, like physical activity, leading to actual increases in gray matter volume on multiple brain parts related to the reward system.

See also

References

2020s fads and trends
Digital media use and mental health